Norström is a surname of Swedish origin and may refer to:

 Mattias Norström (born 1972), Swedish ice hockey player

See also 
 Norrström, a river in Stockholm, Sweden
 Nordstrom (disambiguation)

Swedish-language surnames